The 1994 Marlboro Masters of Formula 3 was the fourth Masters of Formula 3 race held at the Circuit Park Zandvoort in Zandvoort, Netherlands on 7 August 1994. It was won by Gareth Rees, for Alan Docking Racing. Rees' victory made him the second British driver to win the race since David Coulthard in 1991. Jörg Müller of Marko RSM finished in second and Sascha Maassen came in third for Opel Team WTS.

Drivers and teams

Notes

Classification

Qualifying

Race

References

Masters of Formula Three
Masters of Formula Three
Masters of Formula Three
Masters of Formula Three